Kutepova is a rural locality in Besedinsky Selsoviet Rural Settlement, Kursky District, Kursk Oblast, Russia. Population:

Geography 
The village is located on the Rat River (a right tributary of the Seym), 102 km from the Russia–Ukraine border, 13 km south-east of the district center – the town Kursk, 2 km from the selsoviet center – Besedino.

 Climate
Kutepova has a warm-summer humid continental climate (Dfb in the Köppen climate classification).

Transport 
Kutepova is located 2.5 km from the federal route  (Kursk – Voronezh –  "Kaspy" Highway; a part of the European route ), on the road of intermunicipal significance  (R-298 – Belomestnoye – Kuvshinnoye), 7 km from the nearest railway station Konaryovo (railway line Klyukva — Belgorod).

The rural locality is situated 14 km from Kursk Vostochny Airport, 116 km from Belgorod International Airport and 193 km from Voronezh Peter the Great Airport.

References

Notes

Sources

Rural localities in Kursky District, Kursk Oblast